Jacques Pelletier (1 August 1929 in Villers-en-Prayères – 3 September 2007 in Val-de-Grâce hospital, Paris) was a French politician, who served as Senator of Aisne four times: first from 1966 to 1978, second from 1980 to 1988, a month in 1989, and finally from 1998 to 2007. He also served as French Ombudsman (Médiateur de la République) from 1992 to 1998. In 1996, he was made Knight of the National Order of the Legion of Honor.

References 

1929 births
2007 deaths
Ombudsmen in France
Chevaliers of the Légion d'honneur
Lycée Janson-de-Sailly alumni
Government ministers of France
People from Aisne
Senators of Aisne
Deaths from cerebrovascular disease